The 2022 Dawn 150 was the ninth stock car race of the 2022 ARCA Menards Series season, the fifth race of the 2022 Sioux Chief Showdown, and the third iteration of the event. The race was held on Friday, July 8, 2022, in Lexington, Ohio at Mid-Ohio Sports Car Course, a 2.400 mile (3.862 km) permanent road course. The race took it's scheduled 42 laps to complete. In a chaotic race, Taylor Gray, driving for David Gilliland Racing, came home with the win, after making a move on Kris Wright with 3 laps to go. This was Gray's second career ARCA Menards Series win, and his second of the season. To fill out the podium, Parker Chase, driving for Venturini Motorsports, and Sammy Smith, driving for Kyle Busch Motorsports, would finish 2nd and 3rd, respectively.

Background 
Mid-Ohio Sports Car Course is a road course auto racing facility located in Troy Township, Morrow County, Ohio, United States, just outside the village of Lexington. Mid-Ohio has also colloquially become a term for the entire north-central region of the state, from south of Sandusky to the north of Columbus. It hosts a number of racing series such as IndyCar, IMSA WeatherTech Sportscar Championship, NASCAR Xfinity Series, and the ARCA Menards Series, along with other club events such has SCCA and National Auto Sport Association.

Entry list 

 (R) denotes rookie driver

Practice/Qualifying 
Practice and qualifying will be combined into one 60-minute session, with a driver's fastest time counting as their qualifying lap. It was held on Friday, July 8, at 2:00 PM EST. 

Race results

Standings after the race 

Drivers' Championship standings

Note: Only the first 10 positions are included for the driver standings.

References

External links 

2022 ARCA Menards Series
NASCAR races at Mid-Ohio Sports Car Course
Dawn 150
2022 in sports in Ohio